Conches-en-Ouche (literally Conches in Ouche) is a commune in the Eure département in northern France.

Geography
It is located by the Rouloir river, southwest of Évreux in the Normandy region. The town is located on a plateau known as the Pays d'Ouche.

Population

Sights and monuments
 Château de Conches-en-Ouche, ruins of 11th-century castle
 L'église Sainte-Foy
 Abbaye Saint-Pierre et Saint-Paul de Châtillon-lès-Conches
 Arboretum
 Folk museum

Personalities linked to the commune 
 Guillaume de Conches, medieval grammarian, philosopher and theologian linked to the School of Chartres.
 Diderot set an episode of Jacques le fataliste et son maître (1773/1775) in Conches. 
 Victor-Amédée Barbié du Bocage (1832–1890), renowned geographer and essayist, died in the Château de Quenet on 11 October 1890.
 Paul Collin (1843–1915), writer and librettist, was born here.
 François Décorchemont (1880–1971), master glassmaker who made the windows of numerous churches in the Eure and the Church of Sainte-Odile in Paris was born and died in Conches.
 Alfred Recours, mayor of the town since 1984 and a former deputy for l'Eure.
 Roger de Tosny I, medieval knight known as the Moor Eater

International relations

Conches-en-Ouche is twinned with:
 Rhodes, Greece
 Człuchów, Poland
 Wareham, United Kingdom
 Aulendorf, Germany

See also
Communes of the Eure department

Gallery

References

Communes of Eure